Trivendra Singh Rawat (born 20 December 1960) is an Indian politician who served as the Chief Minister of Uttarakhand between 2017 and 2021.

Rawat was a member of the Rashtriya Swayamsevak Sangh from 1979 to 2002 and held the post of organizing secretary of the Uttarakhand region, and later the Uttarakhand state, after the state's formation in 2000. He was elected from Doiwala in the State's first legislative assembly elections in 2002. He retained his seat in the 2007 elections and served as the State's Minister of Agriculture.

As a member of the Bharatiya Janata Party, Rawat served as Jharkhand's in-charge and Uttarakhand cadre's president. Winning from Doiwala again in 2017, he was named the Chief Minister after his party won majority and formed the government. Rawat resigned from the post on 9 March 2021 citing a "collective decision" made by the party.  He did not contest 2022 assembly election.

Early life and career
Rawat was born on 20 December 1960 in the village of Khairasain in the Kotdwar tehsil, in Pauri Garhwal district of Uttarakhand. He was the ninth and youngest child in the family. He obtained his master's degree in journalism from Birla Campus in Srinagar affiliated to the Hemwati Nandan Bahuguna Garhwal University.

Rawat joined the Rashtriya Swayamsevak Sangh in 1979 before becoming its pracharak (campaigner) for the Dehradun region in 1985. Subsequently, he joined the Bharatiya Janata Party (BJP), the political party associated with it. He was made BJP's organizing secretary for the Uttarakhand region and worked with the senior leader Lalji Tandon at the time. He was also actively involved in the Uttarakhand movement, during which he was arrested several times. After the region received statehood in 2000, Rawat was made the state cadre's BJP president.

Rawat lost a by-election from Doiwala in 2014, when the seat was vacated by former Chief Minister Ramesh Pokhriyal.

Chief Minister 
In 2017 he won the same Assembly constituency of Doiwala. His 27 July 2017 tweet about linguistic preferences sparked off controversy and he was accused of preferring Garhwali language over the Kumaoni language.

In July 2019, Rawat said that cow is the only animal that exhales oxygen and that living in close proximity to cows could cure tuberculosis. This unscientific statement sparked off a controversy.

On 9 March 2021, Rawat resigned from the post of the Chief Minister of Uttarakhand. This was following meetings with the BJP leaders in Delhi, whom the observers from centre gave their report about the growing dissent against Rawat among MLAs and ministers, including mismanagement during the Chamoli flash floods.

In May 2021, Rawat said that coronavirus is also a living organism which has a right to live, just like humans. The virus is changing its form constantly. The opposition criticized him and said that his statement is foolish and nonsense, and he has lost his mind and has no vision.

References

External links
Official website of CM of Uttarakhand

Living people
Members of the Uttarakhand Legislative Assembly
State cabinet ministers of Uttarakhand
1960 births
People from Pauri Garhwal district
Bharatiya Janata Party politicians from Uttarakhand
Uttarakhand MLAs 2017–2022
Chief ministers from Bharatiya Janata Party
Chief Ministers of Uttarakhand
Finance Ministers of Uttarakhand